Mythoplastis is a genus of moths belonging to the family Tineidae.

Species
Mythoplastis chalcochra Meyrick, 1931
Mythoplastis exanthes (Meyrick, 1919)

References

Tineidae
Tineidae genera
Taxa named by Edward Meyrick